Kitsilano Beach is one of the most popular beaches in Vancouver, especially in the warm summer months. Located at the north edge of the Kitsilano neighbourhood, the beach faces out onto English Bay.

Description 
The beach is home to the longest swimming pool in Canada, the salt-water outdoor Kitsilano Pool, operated by the Vancouver Park Board and open annually from May to September. 

Toward the northern edge of the beach is a playground and a number of beach volleyball courts.  
In the Squamish language, it is called , which translates to "having red cedar".

History 
In 1901, the beach was being transformed for future inclusion in a city park system. "The whole approach to the beach will be cleared, graded and seeded, and the beach itself cleared of what rocks and driftwood there is to annoy bathers, and the magnificent property will be made available for the people."

Vancouver residents knew the area as "Greer's Beach," after settler Sam Greer who pre-empted 160 acres on the waterfront in 1882 to farm there. When the provincial government granted his land to the Canadian Pacific Railway(CPR), Greer was forced out and his home destroyed.
The CPR considered developing the area into a rail-serviced port facility, but ended up selling off its real estate for development. 

In 1905 the name "Kitsilano" was appearing in real estate advertisements, such as one for "Lots at Kitsilano - Greer's Beach" for sale by the B.C. Electric Railway Company. In 1906 campsites were advertised at "'Kitsilano' Greer's Beach." B.C. Electric made a deal with the CPR to run a tram from downtown Vancouver "to a point called Greer's Beach, or Kitsilano."

In 1906, the company managing the facilities at the beach for the CPR announced plans for a baseball field, a dance pavilion over the water, and a dock for a small ferry to run to the new "country club" at Jericho.

Commencing in 1909 and continuing over several years, the City of Vancouver acquired several portions of what is now the public beach park. In 2005, the old bath house structure was demolished and in its place a new, modern structure was built featuring the Watermark restaurant on top, boasting an expansive view of the beach and English Bay. Recently the Watermark building was sold to The Boathouse restaurant franchise.

References

External links 

Kitsilano Pool

Beaches of Vancouver
Kitsilano